Conor Knighton (born February 1, 1981) is an American actor, host, and television producer. He is currently a correspondent for CBS Sunday Morning.  In 2016, Knighton launched "On The Trail," a year-long, cross-country look at America's National Parks.  The reports air every other week on CBS Sunday Morning. It was to honor the 100th anniversary of the National Park Service.  Knighton has won two Daytime Emmys as part of the Sunday Morning team.

Knighton was the first person to appear on Current TV when it launched on August 1, 2005, and hosted several programs and live events for the network.  He was the host and executive producer of InfoMania, Current's first half-hour show. He left the show at the end of  2010.

He has appeared, as an actor, in shows such as the Gilmore Girls. AMC tapped him to host The Movie List, a weekly countdown of popular movie trivia. In 2011, he hosted the Biography Channel show, My Viral Video. His work has been featured on E!, CNN, CNN Headline News, MTV, TV Guide Channel, Oxygen, and KNBC Los Angeles.  He was a regular panelist on E!'s Chelsea Lately.

In 2012, the EW Scripps Company (one of the nation's largest independent television station owners) hired Conor to create and host a daily look at travel, finance, and consumer issues.

As a correspondent for KCET's SoCal Connected, Knighton was nominated for two Los Angeles Area Emmys and won a 2015 Los Angeles Press Club Award.

Early years
Knighton grew up in Charleston, West Virginia, and attended George Washington High School.  He is a graduate of Yale University.

References

External links
 
 
 Conor Knighton on Twitter

1981 births
Male actors from West Virginia
Current TV people
George Washington High School (Charleston, West Virginia) alumni
Living people
Actors from Charleston, West Virginia
Television personalities from West Virginia
Television producers from West Virginia
21st-century American male actors
American male television actors